The 1910 Louisiana Industrial football team was an American football team that represented the Louisiana Industrial Institute—now known as Louisiana Tech University—as an independent during the 1910 college football season. Led by second-year head coach Percy S. Prince, Louisiana Industrial compiled a record of 7–0.

Schedule

References

Louisiana Industrial
Louisiana Tech Bulldogs football seasons
College football undefeated seasons
Louisiana Industrial football